Yuzhong railway station is a railway station of Baoji–Lanzhou High-Speed Railway, in Yuzhong County, Lanzhou, Gansu, China.

Railway stations in Gansu
Stations on the Xuzhou–Lanzhou High-Speed Railway